Trechus planioculus is a species of ground beetle in the subfamily Trechinae. It was described by Belousov & Kabak in 1993.

References

planioculus
Beetles described in 1993